Yoon Dae-woong (born June 4, 1999), better known as Bigman, is a South Korean beatboxer, singer-songwriter, composer and producer. Bigman is perhaps best known as Top 8 in the Asia Beatbox Championship 2017, as well as got to viral from his wildcard winner video in upload YouTube. Bigman officially signed under Sidus HQ and made his debut with released single album DAY BY DAY on May 31, 2019.

Early life
Born in Cheongju when he was in the third year of middle school he started beatboxing as a hobby and means to relieve stress. Under the influence of his parents who worked as a band, he naturally became interested in music, and he started watching beatbox videos on social media.

Career
Bigman began his beatboxing career in 2017 at the By The JB Beatbox Battle on February 11, 2017 in Gunsan and became top 8 in the quarter-final. On August 12, 2017, he was the entry champions to the Die to Die vol. 3 in Busan and became top 4 in the semifinal. He tried to enter competition on Asian Beatbox Championship in Taiwan and predictably won a wildcard for his entry video, granting him entry to the competition. On August 19–20, 2017, he through the elimination rounds and into the knockout rounds, but lost in the quarter-finals and became top 8. Almost immediately after that event, his wildcard winner video went viral, gaining over a million views practically overnight and various viral video channels promoted the video, prompting his appearance on The Ellen DeGeneres Show on September 13, 2017.

On March 25, 2018, Bigman was entered into a world beatboxer competition, Grand Beatbox Battle held in Basel, Switzerland by Swissbeatbox, but only into the elimination rounds. On August 19, 2018, he was entried another world beatboxer competition is Beatbox Legend Classic held in Foshan, China and became top 8 in quarter-final at result event. On October 11, 2018, he appearance with Korean-American Symphony Orchestra on Korean-American Friendship Concert held in Infinite Energy Area Center, Atlanta, US. On November 16, 2018, he officially signed with Sidus HQ for his music activities. On December 2, 2018, he made his official debut as a singer by participating in producer group 015B with the single song Joshua at Metro.

On May 31, 2019, Bigman released his first single album include the title track song is Day by Day produced by Rocoberry and another track song Get Tired of My Love from his upgrading routine battle, with the director by videoartist's DRGN LAKE.

Musical style
Bigman states that his biggest influence is Gene Shinozaki, who shares a very similar style. They both focus on creating songs rather than battle routines and use a colorful mix of techniques to create a single melody. He listens from references to a lot of Pop and R&B music and makes the composer/songwriter his music by using the skill when beatboxing as a source for music and it has excellent vocal skills and mainly expresses a beatbox with melody or melody based on this. The flow of the existing beatbox, which mainly expressed rhythm and tempo, has been changed to a flow of "make music a beatbox", which has a lot of influence on his flow.

Other ventures
Bigman has maintained numerous national and overseas endorsement deals in various industries throughout their career. He starred in the commercial for Hongkong commercial's PlayStation with beatboxer's KRNFX on January 2, 2018 and in Korea commercial's Subway with singer and member of Mamamoo's Hwasa on August 2, 2018.

Bigman was receiving act as a public relations ambassador for Goesan County, who are gaining great popularity among the public with their friendly image and excellent skills to raise the military status through effective public relations with actor's Ji Min-hyuk on August 17, 2020.

Performance in competitions

Discography

Single albums

Singles

Concerts

Headlining 

 Bigman Concert on Indie Salon (SKT ifland) (2022)

Co-headlining 

 Korean-American Friendship Concert in Atlanta (2018)

Filmography

Television shows

Television dramas

Awards and nominations

References

External links
 

South Korean beatboxers
Living people
1999 births
People from Cheongju